Jejkov is a town district in Třebíč. Jejkov was town suburb in the past. An industrial town district, hockey stadium, football stadium, hospital and court are situated in Jejkov.

Location
Jejkov is situated in the east part of Třebíč south by the river Jihlava.

Jejkov is located east from the center of Třebíč. The border of Jejkov is situated here so that the all street Bedřicha Václavka with houses on both sides  is part of Jejkov to the city office buildings.

Jejkov abutting with town district Horka Domky too. The common border pass a gym of Gymnasium Třebíč  and crosscut Sirotčí street. The border transpierce Husova street and Winter stadium of Třebíč.

History

The old town district of Jejkov didn't exist before foundation of Třebíč town, but some people have lived in right side of the river. Also origin of the name Jejkov is darkly. It can be as founded by Janík, then Janíkov = Jěníkov = Jěíkov = Jějkov = Jejkov.

References 

Třebíč quarters